Matthew Schmidt (born April 30, 1971) is an American film editor, best known for working on several Marvel Cinematic Universe movies, such as Captain America: The Winter Soldier, Captain America: Civil War, Avengers: Infinity War and Avengers: Endgame, alongside Jeffrey Ford, Black Widow alongside Leigh Folsom Boyd, and Thor: Love and Thunder alongside Peter S. Elliot, Tim Roche, and Jennifer Vecchiarello.  

Schmidt first worked with Ford as an assistant editor beginning with the first Avengers film, and started sharing the editing credit with Ford beginning with Captain America: The Winter Soldier.  They edited Avengers: Infinity War and Avengers: Endgame back to back which was a two-year project, and at times, they were editing parts of the film while some scenes were still being shot. More than 900 hours of film was shot between both films, making the editing process a massive undertaking. Both films rank "among the biggest box-office earners of all time."

References

External links 

 

Living people
American film editors
1974 births